Petrone is a surname, and may refer to:

 Epp Petrone (born 1974), Estonian writer, journalist, blogger, and publisher
 Francisco Petrone (1902–1967), Argentine actor
 Pedro Petrone (1904–1964), Uruguayan footballer
 Penny Petrone (1925–2005), Canadian writer, educator, patron of the arts, and philanthropist
 Rocco Petrone (1926–2006), American engineer
 Sonia Petrone, Italian mathematical statistician

Italian-language surnames